Homelands was a music festival run by Mean Fiddler Music Group (now known as Festival Republic) which consisted mainly of dance music, both live acts and DJs. The festival was held in locations in England, Scotland and Ireland in the period 1999 to 2005. The organisers of Homelands were also behind the Home Nightclubs chain including Home Nightclub in London and Sydney.

The English festivals were held at Cheesefoot Head near Winchester, Hampshire, and was one of the most popular British festivals of this genre. 

The Scottish festivals were held in Royal Highland Showground near Edinburgh in 1999, and was held close to New Cumnock in the south of Scotland in 2000.

The Irish festivals were held at the Mosney Holiday Center in County Meath in both 1999 and 2000.

Yearly editions

1999

Homelands festival was on 29 and 30 May 1999. It took place in 'The Bowl', Matterley Estate near Winchester, Hampshire – the site of the 'Creamfields' festival the previous year.

There were nine themed arenas, as follows, with an amazing mix of performers. There are a few acts [Roni Size, Basement Jaxx, Jungle Brothers] that I cannot recall where they performed.

The Home Arena – had the first live Chemical Brothers plus Asian Dub Foundation, Monkey Mafia, Paul Oakenfold, Fatboy Slim, DJ Shadow and Paul Van Dyke.

The MixMag Arena – had a live set from Underworld, plus Faithless, Red Snapper, Dope Smugglaz, DJs Carl Cox, Deep Dish, Gilles Peterson and Darren Price.

The Essential Mix Arena – featuring Radio 1 DJs Pete Tong, plus Paul Oakenfold, Sasha & John Digweed. Radio 1 did a live broadcast from this tent featuring Judge Jules, Danny Rampling and a 4-hour Essential Mix.

The End – hosted by the London club – had two arenas.

The End 01 – a deep house tent, featuring Terry Francis and The End Sound System (Mr C, Layo and Mathew B) plus Darren Emerson, Dave Angel, Stacey Pullen, Laurent Garnier and Carl Cox.

The End 02 – a drum’n’bass arena with DJ Hype, Andy C, Krust, Bryan Gee, Fabio & Grooverider.

Slinky - Bournemouth's "superclub"

US house club Lyall - featuring New York DJ Danny Tenaglia playing a 10-hour set

There were also two arenas hosted by alcohol sponsors

2000
The 2000 festival took place on a very wet Saturday 27 May 2000.  The line included BT, Moby, Public Enemy and Leftfield.

Tents

Ericsson @ Home Arena
Leftfield
Ian Brown
Moby
Public Enemy
BT
Paul Oakenfold
Armand Van Helden
Paul Van Dyk
Scratch Perverts
David Holmes
Dope Smugglaz
Dave Seaman
Meeker
Jeremy Healy
Johnny Moy
Adam Freeland
Dan & Jon Kahuna
Jason Bye
Alfie Costa
Manchild

Radio 1 Essential Mix Arena
Pete Tong
Sasha
John Digweed
Nick Warren
Lee Burridge
Craig Richards
Parks & Wilson
Col Hamilton
Stewart Rowell
Alex Taylor

Slinky & MTV Dancefloor Chart Show Arena
Judge Jules
Paul Van Dyk
Brandon Block
Alex P
Graham Gold
Hybrid feat. Chrissie Hynde
Ferry Corsten
Luke Neville
Lisa Lashes
Garry White
Tim Lyall
Gordon Kaye
Guy Ornadel

Subterrain & Ultimate Base Arena
Carl Cox
Sven Vath
Mr. C
Darren Emerson
Layo & Bushwacka!
DJ Sneak
Jim Masters
Trevor Rockcliffe

The End's Drum & Bass Arena
Reprazent
Fabio
Grooverider
Andy C.
Ed Rush
Optical
DJ Hype
Razor
Zinc
Pascall
Randall
MCs Fats, Dynamite, Moose & Rage

Back2Basics/Deep South/Highrise Arena
Romanthony
Danny Rampling
Jon Carter
Justin Robertson
Junior Sanchez
Steve Lawler
Ralph Lawson
Adam Freeland
Jacques Lu Cont
Rebel Crew (Scott & Robbie Hardkiss)
Tayo
Jenga Heads
James Holroyd

Ministry House Party
Darren Emerson
Davie Reid
Nick Warren
Danny Howells
Lottie
Gareth Cooke
Yousef
Future Shock
Bent
Barry Ashworth

Ericsson MYH Arena
Robert Owens
Juan Atkins
Kevin Saunderson
Sister Bliss
Groove Amada (DJ set)
L.E. Bass
Evil Eddie Richards
Dave Mothersole
T Joy
Richard Grey
J Jeff
DJ Vee

Bud Ice Bus
Richard Fearless
Norman Jay
Jon Carter
Bob Jones & Justin Robertson
Tim Carbutt (Utah Saints)
Jools Butterfield
J. Swinscoe & Tom Chant
Robin Lurie (percussion)

Bacardi B-Bar
Gilles Peterson
Faze Action
Patrick Forge
Ross Allen
Stuart Patterson

Radio 1 Outdoor Sound Stage
Judge Jules
Danny Rampling
Seb Fontaine
Dave Pearce
Daniel Bailey

2005
Officially called "We Love... Homelands" it took place on 28 May 2005 from 1pm to 5am, and had a capacity of 50,000. Headliners included The Streets, Beck, Roots Manuva, Mylo, The Bravery, Audio Bullys, Babyshambles, John Digweed and Dimitri from Paris. Medicine 8 performed in the festival's 'Strongbow Rooms'.

See also

List of electronic music festivals
List of music festivals in the United Kingdom
 Workers Beer Company

References

External links
2005 line up

Music festivals established in 1998
Music festivals disestablished in 2005
Music festivals in Hampshire
Electronic music festivals in the United Kingdom